Netrodera is a genus of beetles in the family Carabidae, containing the following species:

 Netrodera formicaria (Erichson, 1843)
 Netrodera malangana Strohmeyer, 1928
 Netrodera vethi (Bates, 1889)

References

Anthiinae (beetle)